The 2014–15 North West Counties Football League season was the 33rd in the history of the North West Counties Football League, a football competition in England. Teams were divided into two divisions; Premier Division and Division One.

Premier Division 

The Premier Division featured two new teams:

 Nelson promoted as champions of Division One
 1874 Northwich promoted after finishing third in Division One

League table

Promotion criteria
To be promoted at the end of the season a team must:
 Have applied to be considered for promotion by 30 November 2014
 Pass a ground grading examination by 31 March 2015
 Finish the season in a position higher than that of any other team also achieving criteria 1 and 2
 Finish the season in one of the top three positions

The following five clubs achieved criterion 1:
 1874 Northwich
 A.F.C. Liverpool
 Colne
 Glossop North End
 Runcorn Linnets

Results
Games involving Stockport Sports are not included in the overall league tables.

Stadia and Locations

Division One 

Division One featured four new teams:

 Barnton promoted from Cheshire Association Football League Division One
 Litherland REMYCA promoted from Liverpool County Premier League Premier Division
 Wigan Robin Park relegated from the Premier Division.
 Cammell Laird 1907 resigned from Northern Premier League Division One North

League table

Playoffs

Results

Locations

League Challenge Cup
Also called the MEN United Cup for sponsorship reasons.

First round
Each Premier Division club, together with Oldham Boro of Division One, received a bye to the second round.

Second round

[a] No information about result or adjudication of this tie.

Third round

[b] Match played at Colne.
[c] Alsager Town eliminated for fielding ineligible player.

[d] Cammell Laird 1907 eliminated for fielding ineligible player.

Quarter-finals

Semi-finals

Final

First Division Trophy
Also called the Reusch First Division Cup for sponsorship reasons.

Preliminary round
Each of the remaining Division One clubs received a bye to the second round.

Northern Section

Southern Section

First round

Northern Section

Southern Section

Quarter-finals

Semi-finals

Final

References

External links 
 nwcfl.com (The Official Website of The North West Counties Football League)

North West Counties Football League seasons
9